Roy Godfrey Phillips (born 5 May 1941, in Parkstone, Poole, Dorset) is a British musician. He was a member of The Soundtracks (a backing group of The Dowlands), The Saints and The Peddlers.

Background
Phillips is known as the voice and keyboard sound of well-known popular trio, The Peddlers which was formed in Manchester in 1964 .

In later years, Phillips was so taken with New Zealand, he decided to settle there. He has lived there since 1981. he spent some time in Auckland but didn't want to settle there so he moved up north to Paihia and ran a café there for eight years. After that he moved to Queenstown. In 2002, he moved to Christchurch and married to his wife, Robyn.

He is still performing and writing music.

Career

1960s
During the 1960s, Phillips was a member of The Song Peddlers which with addition of Trevor Morais became a trio. The lineup also included Tab Martin. The group were managed by Alan Lewis. A single "Rose Marie" bw "I'm Not Afraid" was released on the Philips label in 1964. The group then became The Peddlers.<ref>KinemaGigz - [https://www.kinemagigz.com/%27p%27.htm#The Peddlers Biogz 'P''' The Peddlers]</ref> Also in 1964, and now known as The Peddlers they had some minor success with their debut single, "Let The Sun Shine In" which was written by Teddy Randazzo.Making Time - The Peddlers They would go on to have hits with "Birth" and "Girlie".Billboard, 30 May 1970 - Page 74 Billboard HITS OF THE WORLD, NEW ZEALAND SINGLES

1970s
In 1976, his group, Peddlers which he had led since 1964 broke up.
In the same year, Phillips's solo album Mr Peddler was released on Warner Bros. It also had a limited release as a private pressing on the Wild Cherry label as Heavy on the Light Side. The Wild Cherry release differed slightly from the Warner Bros. one.Popsike - ROY PHILLIPS/PEDDLARS - HEAVY ON THE LIGHT SIDE - RARE PRIVATE PRESS JAZZ LP, Description Also that year he had a single " Spanish Sun" bw "The Office Party" out on the Sol-Doon label.

1980s to 1990s
In 1983, Phillips had a single released on the Warrior label which included releases by artists the Mike McGregor Band, Mantra and Herbs. The single was "New Zealand, New Zealand" bw "Takapuna".When the Pakeha Sings of Home: A Source Guide to the Folk & Popular Songs of New Zealand, By Mike Harding - Page 77, Page 84
In 1987, his single "Step by step" bw "All girl planet" was released on Zulu Z006. Also in the late 1980s, Phillips headed the Sunday bill at the 6th Southern Comfort Jazz and Blues Festival that was held in New Zealand over the Queen's Birthday weekend.Tommy Adderley (1940-1993): The Man and His Contributions to Pop, Jazz, and Rock Music in New Zealand, By Christine Mintrom - Page 149

2000s
In 2006, he appeared on the television show Close Up, interviewed by John Sellwood.

In 2007, a song by Phillips, "Closer" was featured on a Lord Large album, The Lord's First XI''. The album also featured recordings by Glenn Tilbrook, Clem Curtis, Dean Parrish and Linda Lewis. Phillip's involvement in the project came about as a result of Large's friend, producer/drummer Jones who was honeymooning in New Zealand and had found a new drinking buddy who happened to be Phillips.

His album called "Blue Groove" (2014) was produced and recorded at Roy's "Groove Room" Studios in Christchurch.

In August, 2017, he appeared at Peppers Beachfront restaurant in Gisborne, New Zealand.

Discography (selective)

Citations

References

1941 births
English keyboardists
English pop guitarists
English male guitarists
English multi-instrumentalists
English songwriters
Parlophone artists
People from Poole
Living people
The Peddlers members
The Saints (British band) members